Starling is a given name and a surname.  According to one source, the surname arose in Old English as a nickname related to the bird, starling, but the author speculates "it is hard to see why".  Another source puts the surname into a list of "surnames derived from birds".

Notable people with the name
Given name
Starling Marte, professional athlete

Surname
Alan Starling (born 1951), English footballer
Avril Starling (born 1953), English cricketer
Boris Starling (born 1969), English writer
Bubba Starling (born 1992), American baseball player
Ernest Starling (1866-1927), English physiologist
Geoff Starling (born 1952), Australian rugby league player
Hannah Starling (born 1995), British diver
John Henry Starling (1883–1966), Australian public servant
Josh Starling (born 1990), Australian Rugby League player
Kristy Starling, a Contemporary Christian Music singer
Paul Starling (born 1948), Australian karateka
Ronnie Starling (1909–1991), English footballer
Simon Starling (born 1967), English artist

Fictional characters
Clarice Starling, a main character in the novels and films The Silence of the Lambs and Hannibal
 Juliet, Cordelia, and Rosalind Starling, from Suda 51's hack-and-slash zombie game Lollipop Chainsaw
 Robyn Starling, one of the main characters from the 1993 animated film Tom and Jerry: The Movie

See also
Sterling (given name)
Sterling (surname)

References 

Given names derived from birds